Victims' rights are legal rights afforded to victims of crime. These may include the right to restitution, the right to a victims' advocate, the right not to be excluded from criminal justice proceedings, and the right to speak at criminal justice proceedings.

United States 
The crime victims' rights movement in the United States is founded on the idea that, during the late modern period (1800-1970), the American justice system strayed too far from its victim-centric origins. Since the 1970s, the movement has worked to give victims a more meaningful role in criminal proceedings, aiming at the inclusion of "the individual victim as a legally recognized participant with rights, interests, and voice."

History 
During the colonial and revolutionary periods, the United States criminal justice system was "victim centric" in that crimes were often investigated and prosecuted by individual victims. In the 19th and early 20th centuries, however, the focus shifted so that crime was seen primarily as a "social harm." The criminal justice system came to be seen as a tool for remedying this social harm, rather than an avenue for redress of personal harm, and the role of the victim in criminal proceedings was drastically reduced.

The modern crime victims' rights movement began in the 1970s.  It began, in part, as a response to the 1973 U.S. Supreme Court decision in Linda R.S. v. Richard D. (410 U.S. 614).  In Linda R.S., the court ruled that the complainant did not have the legal standing to keep the prosecutors' office from discriminately applying a statute criminalizing non-payment of child support.  In dicta, the court articulated the then-prevailing view that a crime victim cannot compel a criminal prosecution because "a private citizen lacks a judicially cognizable interest in the prosecution or non-prosecution of another." This ruling served as a high-water mark in the shift away from the victim-centric approach to criminal justice, making it clear that victims in the 1970s had "no formal legal status beyond that of a witness or piece of evidence."

If the Linda R.S. ruling was a clear representation of the problem of victim exclusion, it also hinted at a solution to the problem.  The Supreme Court stated that Congress could "enact statutes creating victims' rights, the invasion of which creates standing, even though no injury would exist without the statute." With this statement, the Court provided a legal foundation for victims' rights legislation.

Along with these legal developments, there was a concurrent growth in social consciousness about victims' rights.  This was due, in part, to the fact that concern for the fair treatment of victims provided a nexus between disparate, but powerful, social movements.  The law and order movement, the civil rights movement, and the feminist movement all challenged the criminal justice system to think more carefully about the role of the victim in criminal proceedings.  Supporters of these causes helped form the grassroots foundation of the modern victims' rights movement, providing educational resources and legal assistance, and establishing the country's first hotlines and shelters for victims of crime.

In 1982, President Ronald Reagan's Task Force on Victims of Crime released its final report which detailed the concerns of victims' rights advocates, claiming that "the innocent victims of crime have been overlooked, their pleas for justice have gone unheeded, and their wounds - personal, emotional, financial - have gone unattended."  The report contained 68 recommendations for service providers and government officials, many of which are mandated through victims' rights legislation today.  The report included a recommendation for a victims' rights amendment to the U.S. Constitution.

In the decades that followed, proponents of victims' rights experienced substantial legislative success.  Today, the Victims' Rights Movement continues to promote legislation that guarantees substantive rights for victims, and provides the procedural mechanisms to effectively enforce those rights.  Victims' rights organizations also do ground-level advocacy, providing individual victims with legal guidance and support, and educate future legal professionals on issues related to victims' rights.

Victims' rights legislation

Since 1982, thirty-three states have amended their constitutions to address victims' rights, and all states have passed victims' rights legislation. That same year, Congress passed the first piece of federal crime victims' rights legislation, the Victim and Witness Protection Act. In 1984, the Victims of Crime Act was passed.  A decade later, in 1994, the Violence Against Women Act became law.  In 2004, the landmark Crime Victims' Rights Act was passed, granting crime victims eight specific rights, and providing standing for individual victims to assert those rights in court.

Federal law

Victims of Crime Act (VOCA)

VOCA established the Crime Victims Fund, which awards grants to crime victim compensation programs, victim notification systems, and victim assistance programs. The Fund is financed by offender fees.

Crime Victims' Rights Act of 2004

The Crime Victims' Rights Act, part of the Justice for All Act of 2004, enumerates the rights afforded to victims in federal criminal cases. The Act grants victims the following rights:

 The right to protection from the accused,
 The right to notification,
 The right not to be excluded from proceedings,
 The right to speak at criminal justice proceedings,
 The right to consult with the prosecuting attorney,
 The right to restitution,
 The right to a proceedings free from unreasonable delay,
 The right to be treated with fairness, and respect for the victims' dignity and privacy

The Crime Victims' Rights Act was named for Scott Campbell, Stephanie Roper, Wendy Preston, Louarna Gillis, and Nila Lynn, murder victims whose families were denied some or all of the rights granted by the Act in the course of their cases.

State law
All states have passed legislation that protects the rights of victims of crime, and most have passed constitutional amendments that afford protection to crime victims. Some state laws apply to only victims of felony offenses, while other states also extend rights to victims of less serious misdemeanor offenses. When a victim is a minor, disabled, or deceased, some states permit family members to exercise rights on behalf of the victim.

Common state law protections include:
The right to be treated with dignity and respect,
The right to be informed about the prosecution, plea offers, court proceedings, and sentencing,
The right to make a statement in court at the time of sentencing,
The right to protection,
The right to seek compensation from a state victim's rights fund,
The right to restitution from the offender,
The right to return of personal property, and
The right to be informed of parole proceedings or release from incarceration, and the right to make a statement to the parole board,
The right to enforcement of victim's rights.
Many prosecuting attorneys' offices have a victim's rights officer or multiple employees who assist victims of crime during and after a prosecution. A crime victim who is seeking compensation or restitution should submit a timely claim for compensation to the probation department or prosecuting attorney, along with documentation in support of the claim, in order to ensure that the amounts are included in a restitution order when the defendant is sentenced.

U.S. victims' rights organizations

National Crime Victim Law Institute
National Crime Victim Law Institute (NCVLI) is a national non-profit legal advocacy organization based at the Lewis & Clark Law School in Portland, Oregon.  The organization was founded in 1997 by Professor Doug Beloof.  It seeks to enhance victims' rights through a combination of legal advocacy, training and education, and public policy work.  NCVLI also hosts an annual 2-day Crime Victim Law conference, and maintains a Victim Law Library, which contains laws and educational resources related to victims rights.

National Alliance of Victims' Rights Attorneys (NAVRA)
NAVRA is a membership alliance of attorneys and advocates dedicated to the promotion of crime victims' rights.  It is a project of the National Crime Victim Law Institute.  Membership in NAVRA provides access to expert services for crime victims, including a searchable database of case summaries, amicus briefs, and sample pleadings, as well as a directory of victims' rights professionals.

National Organization for Victim Assistance (NOVA)
NOVA is a private non-profit organization dedicated to promoting rights and services for victims of crime.  Founded in 1975, NOVA is the oldest national victims rights organization.  The organization is focused both on national advocacy and on providing direct services to victims.

National Center for Victims of Crime
National Center for Victims of Crime is a nonprofit organization based in Arlington, Virginia, that advocates for victims' rights.

Rise
Rise is an NGO working to implement a bill of rights for sexual assault victims.

Europe

European Union 
The Stockholm programme explicitly mentions gender-based violence victims in Sect. 2.3.4, stating that victims of this kind are particularly vulnerable, and therefore in need of special support and legal protection by the state. Victims of gender-based or domestic violence are entitled to the same protections as those who become victims of crime in an EU member state to which they are not nationals, as these kinds of victims are deemed to be more vulnerable and/or exposed to further harm. Victims of terrorism are also deemed to be in need.

Directive 2012/29/EU 
The goal specifically for the Directive 2012/29/EU, as stated by the European Union (EU), was to "improve the real, day to-day situation of millions of victims of crime across Europe to the greatest extent possible". The EU's efforts to increase freedom of movement between states has resulted in a growing concern for maintaining the rights of citizens of the EU when visiting a different member state. The EU deemed that the most important way to solve this was to clearly outline the rights of victims, to strengthen and increase victims' rights as well as increase participation of victims in criminal proceedings.

Austria 
Austria has established protections for Victims of Crime that reside in the EEA Area (EU countries as well as Norway, Lichtenstein and Iceland) or those that are Austrian citizens or permanent residents. Victim services include free access to legal advice and representation, counselling and monetary compensation. Monetary compensation however is capped and is only available to victims of serious crimes, which is defined as crimes where the offender serves no less than six months imprisonment. The compensation is funded by fines imposed on convicted offenders and other sources.

Although Austria is a signatory to the  Victims of Crime Directive (Directive 2012/29/EU) it has not been wholly compliant, given there is little emphasis on rights of interpretation. Applications, phone calls or emails must be made in either English or German which may hinder victims of crime from accessing services fully or understanding their rights without the help of an embassy or consulate. Another breach of the Directive involves the benefits afforded only to Austrian citizens. Austrian citizens are entitled to compensation if they are a victim of crime, even if they suffer an injury in another country, an additional protection for Austrian citizens only. Non EEA nationals have less protection from the state in Austria and must rely instead in contravention of the Directive, on Weissering which is a NFP organisation which provides services for victims of crime. Due to the limited resources (only partly funded by the government, largely reliant on donations) of Weissering, any victim seeking compensation will be means tested and assessed on a case-by-case basis. Emergency assistance may be available in some cases.

In terms of engagement, the Austrian Government recently participated in Victims of Crime Awareness Day, promoting the rights of victims in the workplace which is an issue in Austria, in relation to employee/employer violence  but also employee/client violence. This indicates that the Austrian Government is trying to raise awareness about victims of crime, specifically in areas that are presenting a current issue in accordance with the Directive

Bulgaria 
Bulgaria's attempts to protect and support the rights of victims of crime are generally considered superficial.  Victims are entitled to participate in criminal trials as witnesses, private accusers or complainants, with assistance from legal counsel.  Additionally, legislation provides for protection of vulnerable witnesses (e.g. children, victims of sexual offences) during witness examination way police handled their matters.  A recent International Crime Victims Survey (ICVS), shows that only 40% of victims are satisfied with the way police handled their matters.

Issues for rape victims 
Bulgaria's rape laws have been controversial, with a number of applications made to the European Court of Justice for breaches of the Convention on Human Rights.  In M.C. v Bulgaria, the ECJ held that the decision not to prosecute the rape of a 14-year-old rape victim breached her rights provided under Articles 3 and 8. The legislation enshrined a practice where rapes would only be prosecuted where there was evidence of physical force and active resistance.  The court held that rape laws must apply to all forms of non-consensual sexual acts.

More recently, a number of breaches of the Convention on the Elimination of all Forms of Discrimination Against Women (CEDAW) were highlighted in a Committee report.  The report was critical of Bulgaria's failure to provide for adequate compensation for victims of sexual offences as well as the reliance on gender stereotypes when drafting legislation.

Issues with human trafficking laws 
A recent Council of Europe on Action against Trafficking in Human Beings found that no adult victims of human trafficking received any form of assistance from the Bulgarian Government. A key reason for this seems to stem from peculiarities and uncertainty surrounding the legislative framework on human trafficking. First, it has two separate definitions: one for criminalisation of conduct and one for identification of victims.  The latter is more restrictive, so a person may be considered a victim for the purposes of a criminal trial yet fall outside the definition of 'victim' where support services and compensation are concerned.  Secondly, Bulgaria's legislation operates solely from the perspective of Bulgaria being a country of 'origin' – i.e. that trafficking involves the relocation of Bulgarian nationals to other countries.  As a consequence, victims who are within Bulgaria but are non-EU nationals may fall through cracks in the legislation.

Croatia 
The rights of victims of crimes in Croatia have been improving steadily since Croatia became a candidate for the European Union in 2004. As a result of their wish to become a part of the EU certain prerequisites had to be fulfilled in regards to their criminal justice system and human rights.
Croatia, in order to fulfil said prerequisites, initiated change in their criminal justice system in relation to the rights of victims. The change instigated by the government was in the form of the Department for Support to Witnesses and Other Participants in War Crimes Trials (2005).

At a legislative level, the Criminal Procedure Act (2008) increased the rights of victims both within and of out criminal proceedings and recognised victims as a separate entity in court in addition to their role as a witness and injured party.
These rights include the "right to efficient psychological and other expert help and support from the authority, organisation or institution for aiding victims of criminal offences" and the "right to compensation for material and immaterial damages from the state fund".

2008 also saw the enactment of the Crime Victims Compensation Act. This act resulted in the ability for Croatian citizens to receive compensation if they have endured serious personal injury.

Croatia's progressive stance can be exemplified through the recent case of the introduction of laws regarding the compensation to the victims of rape committed during the 1991–1995 Independence War. This move to compensate said victims was a display of the acceptance of the United Nations Security Council's 2008 resolution which stated rape could be considered a war crime.  In line with the Crime Victim Compensation Act, Croatia's parliament, in 2015, adopted laws awarding victims of rape, committed in the Independence War, compensation. This compensation was in the form of a one-off payment, coupled with a monthly allowance and access to free therapy, medical and legal services.

Cyprus 
Under the Compensation of Victims of Violent Crimes Law of 1997, Cyprus outlines that a victim is a person who has suffered serious bodily harm or impairment to one's health, which is attributed directly to a violent crime, or to an individual who has died as a result of such crime. As a result of this interpretation, crimes against the person which are not considered to be violent, will not result in the labelling of anyone as a 'victim'. This fact can be seen as being particularly relevant to crimes often perpetrated against tourists, such as petty theft.

This is crucial in relation to compensation claims, whereby foreign citizens are not afforded the same access to compensation. Nationals of states party to the European Convention on the Compensation of Victim of Violent Crimes are granted access to compensations, as are nationals of all Member States of the Council of Europe who are permanent residents in Cyprus.  All other foreigners are not granted eligibility in regards to claiming compensation as a victim of any classification of crime committed against them.

The prosecution of traffickers within Cyprus has been identified as a point of issue by the US Department of State. According to statistics gathered, there has been a 55 percent decrease in the conviction of traffickers within Cyprus. Furthermore, perpetrators are often being convicted under statutes which prescribe a much less serious penalty than other anti-trafficking laws. This decrease in convictions reflects a negative impact on victims of trafficking, who may lack faith in a system of criminal justice which does not adequately identify and punish offenders.

Denmark 
When in Denmark victims of crime can access a number of services and support mechanisms to guide them through the criminal justice process.  These services and support mechanisms are implemented through domestic legislation and not international law.

A controversial issue surrounding Danish Victim law is the decision not to sign any European Union directive on victims' rights. One of the most influential articles of EU legislation for victims constitutes Directive 2012/29/EU, which set minimum standards for victims' rights. However, as Denmark is not a signatory they are not obligated to implement the directive.

Despite this decision, Denmark still has a relatively high standard for Victims rights within domestic legislation.The Victims Compensation Law of 2005 allows Danish and foreign citizens as well as Danish citizens living outside of Denmark access to compensation for victims of crime with serious injuries. Danish police are required by law to accept any criminal report irrespective of the language used. Compensation for victims of crime is extensive within Denmark. Compensation can be given to those who suffered serious injuries and dependents of homicide victims. For medical expenses and loss of income there is no limit, whilst other forms of compensation (compensable costs) are capped at 1000 Danish Kroner, being decided by a compensation board. A time period of two years applies for all applications for compensation.

Other support services for victims of crime within Denmark include free legal aid for violent crime upon application and automatic free legal aid for victims of sexual assault. For all other crimes the court will decide on free legal services on the grounds of economic situation and necessity. In addition, every victim whom comes before the system has the right to an interpreter as well as free translation of legal documents from the victim's primary language of understanding. In addition, victim support services are accessible to all residents even in circumstances where no crime has been reported, nor is there any criminal proceeding underway. This allows victims to access services and undergo rehabilitation, even in the instance where a choice is made to not report the crime. In the instance of mediation between offender and the victim, whereby the offender expresses remorse and the victim accepts the apology and reconciles, the judge and therefore the court may formally acknowledge the situation, still applying the sentence, however with a lighter punishment. This empowerment of the victim is often more necessary to provide closure than the strict punishment of the offender.

Upon investigation of the alleged crime, a regional public prosecution or law enforcement officials will decide how to proceed with the case. If there is a decision not to prosecute on behalf of the police, and therefore not proceed to a court trial (closure of the case), the victim can appeal the decision before a regional public prosecutor. If the regional public prosecutor has initially decided to close the investigation, then the next avenue is a submission of appeal is to be directed towards the Director of public prosecutions.

Estonia 
The Estonian citizenship report a high trust in the incorruptibility of their judicial system (74%), legislators (67%) and police (83%). By contrast, however, only 43% of victims of serious crimes said they reported it to the police, and only 17% said they were satisfied with the treatment of their complaint to police.

The NGO 'Estonian Crime Victim Support Society' has been in operation for over 20 years, and released a Victim Support Handbook in 2002 that led a debate about legislation dealing with victim support issues that ultimately cumulated in the Victim Support Act in 2003. This Act was the beginning of a paradigmatic shift in Estonian criminal justice from a strongly retributive mindset to one of restorative justice, and showed a need and interest in caring for victims, as well as much more attention and real practical and material help for victims of crime.

However, the NGO lacks state support and funding, and so is unable to offer high quality victim support throughout Estonia. State victim support only deals with certain types of offences with a fixed agenda and is far more regulated, making the process much more official, and leading to victims uncomfortable participating.

Victims of crime of violence committed within the Republic of Estonia are entitled to state compensation pursuant to the Victim Support Act. Serious damage to one's health, a health disorder lasting at least 6 months or death as a result of a crime of violence may entitle a victim and/or their dependents compensation. A single victim and all his dependents are entitled to compensation equaling 80% of material damage as a result of the crime, but no more than a total 9590 euros, on the basis of: damage arising from work incapacity; medical treatment expenses; damage due to victim death; damage caused to appliances substituting for bodily functions (e.g. spectacles, dentures, contact lenses) and to clothes; funeral expenses of victim.

France 
France is a signatory to the EU's directive on Victims' rights and had until November 2015 to transpose it. As of February 2016, it had still failed to notify the EU what, if any, policies it had implemented to fulfill this. Criminal proceedings in France take the form of an investigation and a trial. Investigations are undertaken by French detective police under the authority of the prosecutor (police investigation) or the investigating magistrate (judicial investigation). If the investigation goes to trial, victims have the right to be involved in the trial and have access to legal counsel.

Compensation 
Under France's Framework Justice Act (2002), police are obligated to inform victims of their right to apply for compensation and seek a civil remedy. Police can register compensation claims on behalf of victims so there is no need to go to court.A state fund for compensation for victims of violent crimes exists called The State Fund for the Victims of Crime. This is partly funded by Criminal Justice bodies who recoup funds from perpetrators (The Reform Act 1990).

Victim resources 
There a number of organisations within France dedicated to providing justice and support for victims of crime in France. The European Justice e-porta fact sheet, offered in over 23 languages, outlines a number of different ones, including the National Victim Support and Mediation Institute (INAVEM). It is partially funded and certified by the department of Justice, and aims to drive, coordinate, and promote victim support missions. The organisation's 08VICTIMS (08 84284637) helpline is always available. It directs victims towards their nearest INAVEM support office who can get the victim assistance from the relevant victim organisation. It also promotes awareness of victims rights, as well as representing victims' aid associations at national, European and international level. The INAVEM has been pushing the French Government to implement the directive, providing recommendations based on their assessment of victims' needs.

Human trafficking 
In 2012, France was found to have violated Article 4 of the European Convention of Human Rights due to its failure to provide an adequate framework to protect the rights of human trafficking victims. As of 2013, however, the Government of France was in full compliance with the required minimum standards for the elimination of trafficking. Despite this, the protection was still largely focused on victims of sex trafficking and not victims of labour trafficking.

Germany 
Justice proceedings in Germany take place under the Inquisitorial System of Justice, meaning that the judge has an active role within the investigation and trial process. In contrast to the Adversarial System of trial, it is possible to have more than two opposing parties in a criminal trial, as there is not such a large requirement of a balance between the prosecution and the rights of the defendant. Therefore, the German Code of Criminal Procedure 1987 (herein 'Criminal Code') gives victims a number of rights, including the right to participate in the trial; the right to appeal after the conclusion of the trial; and the right to seek compensation for their loss.

Links with the European Union 
As a founding member of the European Union, Germany is required to sign and implement to EU's directive on Victims' Rights into their national laws by 16 November 2015. The EU requires that victims are recognised and treated with respect and dignity; protected from further victimisation/intimidation from the offender or within the criminal justice proceedings; receive appropriate support and have access to compensation. Germany's Criminal Code has not been amended since April 2014, therefore nothing has been further implicated. However it is clear that Germany's Criminal Code already satisfies the EU requirements through their extensive rights and protections of the victim, entrenched within their Criminal Code.

Legal representative for victims in the trial 
Unlike many other jurisdictions, Part Five of the Criminal Code allows victims of crime to participate in the criminal proceedings against the accused. For victims of personal offences such as defamation; bodily injury; and property damage, victims are automatically entitled to engage a Private Accessory Prosecutor ('PAP') who will represent their interests at trial. For victims of crime not mentioned in s 374 of the Criminal Code, permission can be sought from the Public Prosecution Office ('PPO').

The Criminal Code rules that the status of the PAP is that of the PPO in the preferred public charge, meaning they are able to participate to the same extent and be heard in the proceedings on the private charges. Furthermore, the PAP is entitled to a period of one week between summons and the main hearing and holds the right to inspect the files through an attorney.

Furthermore, should victim's not be eligible for PAP or choose not to do so, they have the right to engage a legal representative as a witness to uphold their interests when, for example, they are being questions as a witness at the main trial.

Victims' opportunity to appeal the judgment 
PAP in principle, are entitled to appeal a judgement on grounds of fact and law only. However, an appeal by a PAP will be rejected should it be solely on account of leniency of the sentence.

Part three in the Criminal Code addresses appellate remedies and states that an appeal on fact and law needs to be filed with the court of first instance either orally to be recorded by the registry or in writing within one week after pronouncement of the judgment.

A PAP may withdraw at any stage throughout the proceedings but needs to consented by the defendant after the commencement of their examination of the main hearing. The PAP would be deemed to have withdrawn charges, if an appeal on the fact and law was filed by them, this would immediately be dismissed. Once the PAP withdraws, it may not be brought back a second time.  However, it is important to note that the PAP may demand restoration of the 'status quo ante' (previously existing state of affairs) within one week after the default subject to the conditions specified in sections 44 and 45.

Victims' compensation 
Germany has a compensation program for victims of violent or personal crimes. A police report needs to be filed within a year in order to be eligible for compensation. According to the Crimes Victims Compensation Act (1985), all European Union citizens from foreign member states are also eligible for financial compensation. This covers special compensatory damages (out of pocket expenses), such as loss of earnings and medical expenses. However, it does not cover general damages which are non-monetary for example, mental anguish, pain and suffering.

Greece 
In Greece, you are considered a victim if you have suffered damage (either personal injury or harm to/loss of property) as a result of an incident that constitutes a crime under national law.
The motivation behind the Directive 2012/29/EU, effectively setting a minimum standard for victims rights, is illustrated by the case of Robbie Hughes in 2008, a victim of a serious attack in Greece who was left with no support or advice. The EU Member States (except Denmark) were required to implement the Directive into national law by 16 November 2015. However, Greece is one of the 16 countries facing infringement proceedings for the non-communication of the Directive.

In Greece, victims of crime enjoy rights before, during and after the trial process. In certain circumstances, such cases where the victim is a minor or has suffered sexual abuse, victims are afforded additional rights, support and protection. There is no discrimination by support services against foreigners. Foreign victims are entitled to an interpreter when testifying to the police.

However, Greece has been criticised for its lack of upholding minority victims rights and its failure in remedying human rights in cases of hate crime. In order to file a complaint, the current law requires the payment of a fee, dissuading victims of hate crime from reporting offences. This deficiency is exacerbated by the lack of protection for undocumented migrants experiencing hate crime. Demonstrating the limited victim status of migrants and minority groups members is the inadequacy of support where such groups are victims of police abuse. Greece has been condemned by the European Court of Human Rights 11 times for the misuse of weapons by police and the subsequent absence of effective investigations. Migrants or members of minority groups were victims in ten of these incidents.

Compensation for victims of intentional crimes of violence in Greece

For victims of domestic violence and other intentional crimes such as child abuse, if the offender lacks the means to provide compensation for their crime(s), or if the offender remains anonymous, the state of Greece, under the Compensation Directive 2004/80/EC is obliged to provide compensation to victims of intentional crimes of violence. The compensation provided by the perpetrator or the state of Greece must cover financial losses associated with physical damage resulting from the violent crime, this includes medical fees, loss of income and funeral costs. However, psychological damage and trauma resulting from the crime are not compensated. Victims of crime in Greece have five days to report the crime; if the crime is not reported in this timeframe, victims are not eligible for compensation. An application form is required for processing compensation claims, and this is to be completed in Greek. The Hellenic Compensation Authority processes claims for compensation.

Support services available to victims of crimes in Greece

There are a number of services available to victims of crime in Greece. These include:
EKKA –domestic violence and racist attacks
Association for Minors' Protection, NGOs: Hamogelo tou Paidiou,  Arsis– social service for children

Hungary 
In Hungary there is a general lack of understanding in how to combat and prevent domestic violence. This often stems from cultural ideas about women in Hungarian society and the idea that some amount of violence is inevitable. Until new legislation was introduced in 2013, Domestic Violence was not categorized as a separate offence from other assaults.  This means that victims of domestic violence in Hungary were accosted the same rights as victims from a range of circumstances.  According to Human Rights Watch, "authorities [often] told victims that extreme physical violence...should be considered light, and not sufficiently serious to trigger an investigation". However, in other cases when women reported the abuse to the police, the alleged offenders were taken into custody but, quite often released instantaneously without being taken to court. This highlights a lack of support from the police and the courts in combating domestic violence. In many instances, it is the responsibility of the victim, not the prosecution or the police to start a course of legal action which hinders effective remedies of domestic violence. In the ECtHR case Kalucza vs. Hungary 2012, the applicant complained that the Hungarian authorities had failed to protect her abuse from her husband in her home. The ECtHR concluded that Article 8 (right to respect for private life and family life) had been abused by Hungarian authorities.  After the changes in 2013 however, harsher penalties were introduced for perpetrators of domestic violence.  At this time as well, the onus was placed upon the prosecution and not the victim to pursue legal action. This increased the rights of the victims within Hungary in relation to domestic abuse.  In spite of these changes however, an instance of domestic violence will only be considered if there have been two separate instances of abuse. Furthermore, the amendments only protected partners who were living together and neglected to protect those who were not living in the same residence. The new legislation is also lacking in a plan of a National level that could effectively combat domestic violence as an issue. Procedures have been put in place to help police respond to instances of domestic violence however, no such guidelines exist for judges, prosecutors, social workers and healthcare workers. Ultimately the provisions are not strong enough to deal with the issue sufficiently they are also not accepted and applied. Hungary also did not sign up to the Istanbul Convention, a practical convention aimed at combating domestic violence. It concluded that countries should "establish hotlines, shelters, medical and foreign services, counselling and legal aid" in order to protect abused women.

Ireland 
Following the introduction of the directive on victims rights by the EU in 2012.(reference the directive) It is particularly relevant to examine the avenues available to victims in terms of compensation and legal aid, and avenues for retribution.

Compensation 
There are a number of ways to claim compensation as a victim of crime, be it through a court order dictating that an offender must pay compensation to you. If you are injured as a result of a crime, you can seek to claim compensation under the Scheme of Compensation for Personal Injuries Criminally Inflicted. This would be funded through the Department of Justice and Equality and administered by the Criminal Injuries Compensation Tribunal.
To seek compensation for an injury inflicted in another EU state you need to contact the compensation tribunal to gain information around how to claim compensation from the member state in question.
There is no time limit to making a claim if the injury inflicted resulted in the death of a victim. if this did not occur, claims must be made within 3 months.

Eligibility for compensation 
Compensation will be provided to victims, or in the event of a fatality, the immediate family of the victim.
The scheme of compensation is available to you if you were injured as a result of violent crime or if you were injured in assisting another victim of crime or whilst attempting to save a life.
You do not need legal representation to apply for compensation and then tribunal is not obliged to cover any legal costs.
No compensation will be given to you in the event you were living with the perpetrator at the time of the attack, meaning this is not available to victims of domestic violence.  In addition, the compensation scheme does not exist to provide retribution for pain and suffering, but instead to cover out of pocket expenses and medical bills.
Compensation is means tested and may vary depending on welfare payments, salary, and sick leave. The tribunal also considers your character and way of life when deciding compensation level. If you are found to have provoked the injury, compensation is unlikely to be provided.

How to apply for compensation 
There are a number of ways to claim compensation as a victim of crime, be it through a court order dictating that an offender must pay compensation to you. If you are injured as a result of a crime, you can seek to claim compensation under the Scheme of Compensation for Personal Injuries Criminally Inflicted. This would be funded through the Department of Justice and Equality and administered by the Criminal Injuries Compensation Tribunal.
To seek compensation for an injury inflicted in another EU state you need to contact the compensation tribunal to gain information around how to claim compensation from the member state in question.
There is no time limit to making a claim if the injury inflicted resulted in the death of a victim. If this did not occur, claims must be made within 3 months- to make a claim for compensation a police report must have been completed.

Avenues for seeking assistance as a victim of crime 
Ireland Human Rights Advocates
Ireland Irish Council for Civil Liberties: Ireland (Consortium Leader and Western European Cluster) Irish Council for Civil Liberties (ICCL) (1976), headquarters in Dublin, ICCL is Ireland's independent human rights watchdog, which monitors, educates and campaigns around the protection and promotion of human rights in Ireland. ICCL is the lead partner in JUSTICIA
Victims Rights Alliance: The victims rights alliance is a group of victims rights and human rights organisations in Ireland. They are largely responsible for victim's rights being upheld and enforced.
Know Your Rights
Victims Directive of the European Union: Guidelines for those who have been impacted by crime. Outline of the rights of victims and possible strategies and how to make complaints. (Note: As of February 2016, Ireland has failed to publish the Victims of Crime Bill [reference: Victims Rights Alliance]).
Crime Victims Helpline: Understand what your rights are and how they are protected, how to cope with the effects of crime as well as support agencies and information about the Criminal Justice System.

Italy 
Victims rights are outlined by the Code of Penal Procedure which details that during the prosecution and sentencing stages, victims have the right to be informed of judicial proceeding developments and can produce evidence at any stage of the trial. Victims also have the right to oppose the Judge for the Preliminary Investigation's request for dismissal of the case and to protect their rights by having a defending counsel if necessary.

Article 90 of the Code of Penal Procedure states that victims are allowed to present written memories and statements at any stage of the judicial process that indicate evidence. Furthermore, section 3 of Article 90 states that if a victim has died as a result of the crime then the power of rights as states by law are able to be exercised by close relatives of the victim.

Victims are able to access assistance agencies, which have the primary objective of providing adequate compensation. The amount and source of compensation is determined by the nature and severity of the crime. For instance, victims of organized crime and terrorism are entitled to up to 100,000 US dollars from the State while victims that have experienced property or medical damage will be compensated by their offenders. Additionally, a victim with special needs may be granted of free legal aid and will be compensated by both private donations and a proportion of the pay received by convicted working prisoners from the Department of Prisons. The victims' assistance agencies also provide the option to accompany the victim at trial with their consent.

Child victims 
One of the most vulnerable victim groups in Italy is children under the age of 16. Some of the most prevalent challenges faced by children in Italy include child labor, forced participation in organized crime and also becoming refugees after fleeing their own nation. Although young victims have rights explicitly stated in the Italian Penal Code, the Italian criminal justice system lacks ongoing supportive resources to protect the rights of children.

The European Commission has outlined the rights of the victims and states that all victims will be individually assessed to identify vulnerability. Young victims are always presumed vulnerable and particular attention is paid to categories such as victims of terrorism, organized crime, human trafficking, gender-based violence, victims with disabilities, sexual violence and exploitation. Furthermore, according to the United Nations Office on Drugs and Crime and article 609 decies of the Italian Penal Code, a child victim of sexual exploitation is to be assisted throughout the entire proceedings.

Article 498 of the Italian Code of Penal Procedure states that the investigatory examination of a child in a court of law must be undertaken by the President of questions and is also assisted by a family member or child psychologist.

Malta 
Following a report commissioned by former justice minister Chris Said lamenting the poor state in which victims were treated, Malta introduced the Victims of Crime Act (2015) on the 2nd of April of that year. The report emphasised the need to increase the amount of resources for the legal aid office and said that victims should be able to receive benefits from the service. The new Act provides free legal aid to victims of crime, where this was only open to the accused prior to its assent.

According to Dr Roberta Lepre, director of Victim Support Malta, there are three primary focuses in the legislation: information, support, and protection. In terms of information, victims now have the right to easily access to clear information about the relevant procedures, what support services are available, how to access legal aid services, how to access compensation, and whether they are entitled to translation services. Victims also now have the right to receive acknowledgement of a complaint, outlining the basic elements of the crime concerned as well as ongoing information about his or her case. Further, if police do not arraign suspect, the victim has right to be informed of the decision in writing.

When it comes to support, victims now have the right to free use of support services following a needs and risk assessment. Support services also include information on how to receive information on prevention of further risk of victimisation, and access to counselling for emotional or psychological damage. Competent authorities are also obliged to inform victims of ways in which they can be protected, such as seeking a protection order.

The legislation is primarily aimed at allowing victims a greater voice, and potentially working towards reconciliation between victim and offender by decreasing the hardship of the former. For the purposes of the Act, a victim is one who has suffered "physical, mental or emotional harm or economic loss which was directly caused by a criminal offence". This also applies to family members of those who have died as a direct result of a crime. Such broad provisions allow for the benefits to be accessed by many people. It is too early to say, however, whether the new legislation has been implemented effectively.

Lithuania 
Lithuania has several national mechanisms relating to the rights and support for victims of crime. The Ministry of Justice, Ministry of Foreign Affairs, and the Police Department of the Ministry of the Interior each provide legal aid and set up measures of protection for victims of crime.

As of 1996, the Parliament of Lithuania has adopted a law providing for the protection of parties in relation to criminal offences, which can be extended towards victims of crime and their families against further victimization. As per methods of victim compensation, additional provisions such as Article 107 allows for voluntary compensation for victims of crime. If this has not occurred, Article 110 stipulates that the victim can charge the offender with a civil suit, be it of a direct or indirect consequence. Further, if the offender is not able to provide compensation for the victim, Article 118 contends that the state will provide compensation in advance.

In addition to these rights provided to victims of crime, there are many NGO's operating within Lithuania to provide facilities and support for victims. These include the 'Crime Victim Care Association of Lithuania'. Cartias Lithuania, Missing Person's Support Centre, Klaipeda Social and Psychological Support Centre, Child House and the International Organization for Migration – Vilnius Office.

Studies have been conducted into the physical and psychological state and needs of victims post criminalization, especially that of victims of trafficking. These studies greatly assist NGO's understanding and assisting victims of crime providing greater relief during the criminal trial process, incarceration system and return to everyday life.

Latvia 
Latvia does not have a comprehensive victim support system, nor is there a single policy that suggests that the development of such a system would be seen as a priority in the near future. Despite this, the criminal procedure law of Latvia includes a specific chapter dedicated to victims. This chapter outlines the procedural rights and obligations of victims.

In Latvia, in order to be recognized as a victim under the criminal procedure law four steps must be undertaken. Firstly, a criminal procedure must be initiated. Secondly, there must be information that suggests as the result of the offence the person was harmed. Thirdly, the person who experienced the harm must agree to become a victim within the criminal proceedings. Fourthly and finally, the person in charge of the criminal proceedings must recognise that the person is a victim. Once these four steps take place, and the person is established as a victim, the victim gains victim rights.

Victims of crime in Latvia have access to legal aid. Legal aid is often unaffordable to victims however, as although expenses for legal assistance be reimbursed from the offender, the victim has to pay the costs upfront at the time.

State compensation, for moral injury, physical suffering or financial loss, is available to victims of certain types of crimes. This includes in cases of intentional criminal offences, if the offence resulted in death, if the offence resulted in severe bodily injuries or if the perpetrator of the offence was not identified and thus has not been held criminally liable. The maximum amount of compensation is give minimal monthly wages and the amount awarded depends on the severity of the crime. In the case of the crime causing the victim's death, 100% of compensation shall be awarded.

Human trafficking 
Latvia is a Tier 2 source and destination country persons trafficked for sexual exploitation and forced labour. To safeguard the rights of victims of trafficking, the government of Latvia has increased the accessibility of government funded protections, such as offering victims of trafficking temporary residency in exchange for participating in the judicial process against human traffickers. During this period of investigation, qualifying victims are offered government aid, which is 70% of the maximum amount of state compensation. Victims who do not meet the qualifying criteria are referred to non-governmental organisations for aid. Furthermore, victims who may have directly or indirectly participated in unlawful activity as a result of their trafficking can avoid prosecution.
Intersecting with social services and assistance laws, the Latvian government also ensures the social rehabilitation of the victims of human trafficking. The Government of Latvia has also established an "anti-trafficking action plan" for 2014–2020 to strengthen the rights of victims of trafficking, and to increase awareness of the crime.

Luxembourg 
Luxembourg has a well-developed program of victim support services through the state run Victim Support Service (part of the Ministry of Justice). It is one of only five Member States where the Ministry of Justice is solely responsible for the distribution of these services. Victims' rights are also actively enforced during the different stages of the criminal justice process, including: during the investigation of a crime, during a trial and after a trial. The state also coordinates with non-profit organisations, including through the provision of financial support, in order to assist in the development of legal reforms and to better coordinate at a grass roots level. For example, one such organisation, Women in Distress, works to provide women, their children and young girls with effective protection against violence by way of refuges and information and consultation centres. Through this process, Luxembourg has become one of only nine Member States to fulfil the Council of Europe's recommendation of one counselling centre per 50,000 women.

Victims of crime can report the crime to the police or directly to the public prosecutor. Reports must be submitted in one of Luxembourg's official languages: Luxembourgish, French and German. An interpreter is available for free of charge for people who do not speak these languages. Statutory limitation periods for reporting apply. Victims are able to be directly involved in the process by acting as witnesses and providing testimony. Interpreters are free of charge and the victims are entitled to be represented by lawyers. Police must undergo a mandatory course on victimology which is partly run by the 'Service d'aide aux victims' (SAV). Police are obligated to inform victims of their rights to:

(i)	receive assistance from VSS;
(ii)	compensation for damages;
(iii)	receive legal aid (available on the fulfilment of certain conditions); and
(iv)	to be fully informed about the status of their proceedings. If the case does not proceed to court, reasons for this outcome must be provided in order to help the victim decide whether to appeal this decision.

Compensation 
In the interest of justice, Luxembourg offers compensation for victims who have suffered physical injuries from crime. Compensation is only paid out in instances were victims were unable to obtain adequate compensation from insurance, social security or from the offender.  In 2012, over 405,000 Euro was paid out in compensation. This exceeded the budgeted amount of 350,000. A request for compensation has to be initiated within two years of an offence occurring and is addressed to the Ministry of justice. A commission formed by a magistrate, senior civil servant of the Minister of Justice and a lawyer will then meet within an applicant to assess if an application is successful. The maximum amount that could be awarded as of 2009 was 63.000 Euros. By way of appeal, legal action against the State can be brought before the 'tribunal d'arrondissement' of Luxembourg or Diekirch.

Directive 2012/29/EU 
Directive 2012/29/EU seeks to ensure that all victims of crime have better rights, support and protection throughout all of Europe. Member states, including Luxembourg, were required to implement the terms of the Directive into national legislation by 16 November 2015. However, almost 60% of these have failed to comply with the requirement to communicate the legislative texts which transpose the Directive to the commission. As Luxembourg is one of these states, it now has an infringement case open against it.

Hotlines 
The government of Luxembourg has implemented two telephone hotlines to assist victims of crime. The first, which assists victims in general, can be reached at +352 475 821-628/627. The second, directed specifically at youth and children, can be reached at + 352 12345.  Further support is available online.

Netherlands 
Criminal Justice in Netherlands has seen an era of reform with a greater focus placed on the rights of victims of crime. In 1987, a new victim-orientated reform was put in place in which victim's interested were to be taken into account during all processes of the criminal justice system. The reform of criminal law in the eyes of victims brought forth regulations in favor of victims' rights. Various procedural elements allow for victim compensation and institutional obligation to protect victim rights through policing, criminal proceedings and victim rehabilitation.

In practice, all official institutions are subject to monitoring by the National Ombudsman. If victims of crime feel they have been unjustly treated and victim-related rules were not correctly protected, they are able to raise a complaint with the Ombudsman. In light of this, Netherlands enforces levels of state compensation, which offers a 'one-off' payment, and has been institutionalized since 1974.

For further victim support, various NGO's operate within Netherlands on a local level and care for victims of crimes through providing emotional support, practical advice and judicial advice. An example of this support is seen within the nationwide agency Slachtofferhulp is partly funded by the government and gives aid to victims in specific groups and to victims of crime in general.

Poland 
Domestic violence rates are very high in Poland, due to a number of factors.
After surveying Polish women, it was found that as many as one in six women, from a variety of backgrounds and age groups, were victims of domestic violence. The Polish criminal justice system fails to effectively assist these victims and does not take their cases seriously. Unfortunately many perpetrators only receive suspended sentences and their female partners are often financially dependent on them and must continue to live with them. Furthermore, the authorities mistrust women who report domestic violence. Poland fails to meet its obligations under international human rights law, in relation to the rights of domestic violence victims.

In order to improve the rights of domestic violence victims in Poland, the Blue Card program was introduced as a way of standardising police interaction with those that involved in cases of domestic violence, including the family of the victim. This program enables persons who have alleged to be victims of domestic violence (DV) to gain access to services in counseling, support and reparations. Anonymous or suspicion of DV is enough for issuance of a "Blue Card – B". A Blue Card – B consists of a brochure detailing further actions against violence, help and support centre's near by, and is applicable to the whole of Poland. The efficiency of support centres indicates a positive increase in individuals attending victim support centre's, it however does not indicate a decrease in DV occurrence. In 2000 the Ministry of Justice in Poland sparked the notion of "Victim Support Week", connected to the International day of Victims of Crime These proactive measures are not legally regulated however do show promise in moving the Polish Nation forward to support those effected by domestic violence.

General victim support centres have extended ranges since 2012 following the implementation of tasks in article 11 of the Ministry of justice Directive. Such implementation includes covering costs of heath services, medical products, secondary or vocational education, temporary accommodation and other facilities. Weak aspects still include; uneven support on a national basis in provinces that are further reaching, non-uniform project development and insufficient numbers for providing assistance, both legally and psychologically. Strong aspects however must be acknowledged, including the establishment of networks with communicative and mutual support, as well as assistance fund establishments and legal compensation.

Portugal 
In Portugal, victims of crime (both tourists and national citizens) have 6 immediate rights; The Right to Information, The Right to Receive a Statement of the Complaint, The Right to Translation, The Right to Compensation for Participation in the Process and to the Reimbursement of Expenses, The Right to Compensation from the Perpetrator of the Crime, and The Right to Compensation from the Portuguese State.

A 'victim of crime' is defined as; having "suffered damage, as a result of an incident which constitutes a crime according to national law". During legal proceedings, a victim in Portugal can assume two roles: as an assistant, where they cooperate with the Public Prosecutor in the proceedings, or as a civil party, where they act only to provide evidence to support the claim for damages

The Portuguese Government offers several avenues of help and support for victims of crime such as; the National Commission for Protection of Children and Young People at Risk, Directorate General of Social Affairs, The Portuguese Association for Victim Support, the Commission for Equality and Against Racial Discrimination, and Open Window – Support to Victims of Domestic Violence.

Slovakia 
Slovakia is a nation where various targeted groups, particularly young women, as well as men, the disabled, the uneducated and the unemployed are commonly susceptible to the likes of fabricated international job prospects; and in turn increase their likelihood of becoming a victim of the human trafficking trade. Many Slovakian's end up being deported to highly active trafficking countries; such as, 'Germany, Austria, the UK, Ireland, Switzerland and Poland'. Slovakia is a prominent country which specifically has victims from Bulgaria, Romania, Vietnam, Ukraine and Moldova. People from these countries are then transported against their own will, compelled into sexual activity and prostitution.

The Government of the Slovak Republic undertook numerous steps to tackle the fight against human trafficking. In 2005 an Action Plan was initiated to undertake steps to 'control and coordinate' the activity of the slave trade. This Action was further improved with the implementation of the 2011 'National Program to Combat Trafficking in Human Beings for the years 2011–2014'. Improvements regarded achieving an effective solution to combat human trafficking. Additionally, emphasis surrounded ensuring adequate support and care for subjected victims. This includes victims receiving 'comprehensive care' and prepare them for their return to their home country.

Slovenia 
Slovenia currently has a very low crime rate (30.75 and 7.32 rapes per million people, as of 2010).

Slovenia has regulated the rights of victims of crime during legal proceedings in the Criminal Procedure Act. Before this act was introduced, victims of crime were still entitled to compensation under civil law.
In 2005, the Witness Protection Act, the Crime Victims Compensation Act, and the Resolution for Preventing and Combating Crime came into effect. The Resolution focuses particularly on protecting human rights and fundamental freedoms, in terms of victims of crime. Slovenia's definition of victims includes immediate families of the injured party.

Victims are entitled to:
Be heard during proceedings, to give evidence, to pose questions to witnesses and experts involved, to be acquainted with all rights and for the injured party, a right to inspect material evidence supplied. They are also entitled to a translator to avoid language difficulties. Slovene is the national language, but Italian and Hungarian are also spoken in certain regions of Slovenia.
To claim compensation either through the criminal proceedings, or through civil suit if necessary to avoid delays.

In certain criminal offences, such as sexual abuse or mistreatment and neglect of minors or trafficking in human beings, the minor-injured party is required to have a specific authority to look after their rights, and certain stipulations apply to the investigation procedures, such as preventing the offender from being in the courtroom at the same time as the minor-offender during the proceedings.

Witness protection:
If during criminal proceedings, the physical safety of the victim and/or their immediate families is in danger, they are entitled to the greatest amount of protection possible in pre-trial, during and after the procedure is completed. Within the Slovenian Police, the Endangered Persons Protection Unit specifically oversees the protection of witnesses under the Witness Protection Act. The Unit is also encouraged to engage with non-governmental organizations if necessary in order to provide appropriate psychological and legal assistance to the protected persons, separate from other forms of compensation they may receive. The Unit also allows for alternate measures during proceedings, for example providing evidence via video conference. These are set out in the Official Gazette of the Republic of Slovenia, as is the Code of Obligation which specifically concerns the rights of victims of terrorist violence in Slovenia.

Code of Obligation regarding victims of terrorist violence:
If terrorist violence occurs, the Code of Obligation states that the state, or the person who should have prevented the harm (depending on whether there was a statewide or individual failure), is responsible for redressing the harms to the victims, and liable for damages. Liability will still apply regardless of whether the person or state who should have prevented the violence, did everything they could to prevent it. These rules also apply to acts of violence that occur during public demonstrations or gatherings.

For victims of crime in Slovenia, there are several websites dedicated to assisting victims understand the process for receiving compensation such as the European Judicial Network (soon to updated to the European e-Justice Portal). Here the process is clearly outlined including conditions for applying for compensation, legal assistance available and the form and amount of evidence required. Of particular concern to Slovenia's government is the protection of women's rights. In place to protect women's right under Slovenian Law are Article 14 of the Constitution of Slovenia which, "guarantees everyone equal human rights and fundamental freedoms" and "equality before the law" as well as article 53 which states, "marriage is based on the equality of both spouses" and "the state shall protect the family", article 141 of the Criminal Code "Violation of Right to Equality", as well as the 2002 Act on Equal Opportunities for Women and Men which imposes punishments on all people, especially an official who can be imprisoned for up to three years for discrimination. The Slovenian government has also established an Office for Equal Opportunities to manage Acts related to equal opportunities and engage in activities which focus on areas such as the inclusion of women political and violence against women.

Spain 
Victims of crime in Spain have a number of avenues available to them to seek legal compensation or aid for the damages they have suffered. The Ministry of Justice is the state body who is in charge of awarding compensation to victims. It also is responsible for state legal aid, and has a separate department for protection of victims of terrorism-related crimes.

Beyond the Ministry of Justice, there are organisations such as the Office of Crime Victims Assistance Barcelona, the Association of Terrorism Victims, the 11-M Association of Victims of Terrorism and the National Association of Victims of Violent Crime (which provides psychological assistance and specialises in aiding victims of domestic violence). These associations are all able to assist with legal aid and providing general information to people affected by crime about their rights.

If you are a foreign citizen who is a victim of crime in Spain, you should contact your country's embassy or consulate as soon as possible.

Legal process 

In a criminal trial in Spain, the victim can choose to participate in the trial either as a witness, or as a 'private prosecutor' ('acusación particular') which grants them additional rights and responsibilities, and makes them an official party to the trial.

If you wish to claim compensation in Spain, you must submit an application form to the Ministry of Finance, and a separate 'petition for assistance' must be filed with the Ministry of Economy and Finance. There will then be a hearing, and the state attorney will submit a report for consideration. During the hearing, the victim must prove they were legally in Spain at the time of the crime.
If you are a foreign citizen and you wish to apply for compensation, then you must provide evidence during the hearing of situations where your home country has provided compensation similarly for Spanish citizens – this is referred to as 'proof of reciprocity'.

Compensation 
Compensation will only be awarded after the criminal trial is concluded and the offender is found guilty. In exceptional circumstances, a victim or the family members of a victim may claim emergency compensation before the conclusion of the trial, if their 'precarious' situation can be validated by the relevant authority.
Spanish law does not provide a maximum amount of compensation that can be awarded, but determines a maximum amount for the individual based on different factors. The amount of compensation a victim or their beneficiaries is entitled to is determined based on the minimum monthly salary of the victim, and the negative mental and physical effects the victim suffers as a direct result of the crime. The financial situation of the victim, the number of people dependant on the victim, and the cost of therapy and psychological healthcare are all considered when deciding how much compensation is awarded.
Compensation can be awarded to cover medical expenses, mental health expenses, lost wages for disabled victims, lost wages for dependants of homicide victims, and funeral and burial expenses. The compensation amount is paid by the offender, and if they are unable to pay then the Spanish government will cover the amount – however if the victim's losses are covered by insurance (i.e. in circumstances of theft) then they are not eligible for compensation.

Directive on victims' rights 
According to the European directive on victims' rights, Spain is showing compliance with the directives. However, information for victims of crime for citizens and non citizens can be quite strenuous to find due to specialised websites for each organisation. In comparison, the UK have implemented one simple to use website for victims of crime which makes information for victims rights far more accessible. A similar system could better help victims of crime in Spain with creating awareness of their rights.

Sweden 
Various laws addressing victim's crimes were enacted from the mid-1980s onward in Sweden. In 1988 alone, Sweden ratified the European Convention on the compensation of victims of violent crimes and passing the Act on Visiting Bans Act on Counsel for Injured Party in 1988. Crime victims may be represented y a legal advisor throughout the legal process under the provisions of the latter Act. Under the 1994 Government Bill "Crime Victims in Focus" various provisions were designed to improve for crime victims. For example, The Crime Victim Fund established together with the Crime Victim Compensation and Support Authority allows the assessment of state compensation and provide economic support for research, education and information on crime victims, financed through a few imposed in everyone convicted of a crime punishable by imprisonment.

Crime victims became a separate area of responsibility for Swedish social services in 2001 through the Social Service Act. Despite not actually strengthening crime victims' rights not increase costs at the time, it served as a normative reorientation of the Social Services Act towards a holistic view and right to assistance according to need.

Victim–offender mediation 
Swedish multiplicities are obliged to offer mediation, based on restorative justice principles, to offenders under 21 years old.  Simultaneously, offenders are offered the chance to deeply apologise for their actions and redeem themselves. The expectation is that mediation has the potential to substantially reduce cases of recidivism.

The mediation system in Sweden evolved independently from any political decision-making procedure in the second half of the 1980s. In 1998, the role of mediation in the justice system for young offenders was analysed by the Commission on Mediation which then founded their policy recommendations for legislative reforms on these evaluation studies in 2000. Mediation was formally acknowledged in 2002 by the Mediation Act (Swedish Code of Statutes, 2002:445), where the aim of mediation is explained in Section 3 as:

Mediation happens for the interests of both sides. The goal is to reduce the negative effects of the crime committed. Mediation aims to help to increase insight for the offender of the consequences of the offence. At the same time, opportunities are given to the victims to process and finally in a comprehensive way integrate the painful experience. The act offers the chance for victims to express their emotional needs and have them addressed in an attempt to prevent recurrent symptoms of anxiety, self-image distortions and loss of self-esteem and self-confidence as the result of being victimised.

Mediation is one of several procedural operations available to a prosecutor, and sentencing an offender to mediation may be seen as a lenient sentence where the offender benefits. Another criticism is that mediation will further violate the victim's integrity and well-being.

Romania

Human trafficking 
Human trafficking in Romania is a prominent issue. The country is used as a 'source, transit and destination country for men, women and children subject to labor trafficking and women and children subject to sex trafficking', meaning that various victims in different stages of trafficking are either poached from, exploited or transferred to Romanian soil. Promisingly, the numbers have been to decreasing in recent years ( in 2005 there were  2551 recorded victims of human trafficking, in 2009 there were 780) perhaps due to mechanisms such as the National Agency for Preventing Trafficking in Persons and for monitoring the Assistance Granted to Victims of Trafficking in Persons Agency, legal implementations such as Law 678/2001 (combating trafficking in persons); G.D 299/2003 (standard rules for application of Law 678); law 211/2004 (protection of victims) and G.D 1654/2006  to approve the National Strategy against Trafficking to approve the National Strategy against Trafficking in Persons in persons 2006–2010).   Romania also prescribed to international legal mechanisms such as the UN Convention against Transnational Organized Crime and Council of Europe Convention on Action against trafficking Human Beings, showing that is making a conscious effort to eradicate human trafficking within the state. These mechanisms show that Romania is taking active steps towards ensuring that all individuals can live a life free from exploitation.

Violent crimes 
Between the years of 2004–2011, 800 people were killed as a result of crimes involving domestic violence

Psychological counselling is provided to victims of  attempted homicide, murder, hitting and other violent criminal offences. Counselling is provided free of charge for up to 3 months, and 6 months for victims under the age of 18. Other forms of assistance by not governmental organisations, independent or in partnership, can also be provided by way of referral.

Upon application, free legal aid is provided to several categories of victims. Factors taken into account include the seriousness of the offence committed and material status of the victim. Direct victims of serious violent or sexual offences (e.g., homicide, serious bodily harm, rape, sexual perversion committed upon a minor) are provided with free legal aid. Additionally, indirect victims of such offences, such as close family members, may also be granted free legal aid. For any of the above offences, free legal aid is granted if the offence was committed within Romanian territory, or if the victim is a Romanian citizen or foreign citizen living legally in Romania and the criminal prosecution is taking place within Romania.

Prior to the commencement of Law 211/2004, when a perpetrator of a crime remained unknown, insolvent, or was missing, the "costs" of the offence were incurred by the victim alone.  Currently, upon application, a victim may be granted financial compensation for serious violent and sexual crimes.

The birth of the National Agency for Family Protection (NAFP) has increased support for victims of domestic violence. The agency has assisted in the setting up of shelters for victims of domestic violence, recuperation centers for victims of violence and assistance centers for aggressors.

United Kingdom 
In 1974, the charity Victim Support was set up in Bristol, aimed at providing help and support to victims of crime on a local and national level. Trained volunteers and employees offer free, confidential, practical and emotional support to people affected by crime in England and Wales. The charity offers support to around one million victims of crime per year. People may seek practical or emotional help, for example, making their home secure after a burglary, applying for compensation from the Criminal Injuries Compensation Authority, getting re-housed, or asking for counselling through a GP.

Victim Support also provides specialist services, such as: a national "homicide service", helping families who have been bereaved by murder or manslaughter, local services helping victims of domestic or sexual violence, exploitation, anti-social behaviour, or hate crime, local services for young victims of crime, including specialist support for children who have to testify in court and for recent victims of grooming, and using restorative justice to help victims.

In Scotland and Northern Ireland, similar services are provided by the charities Victim Support Scotland and Victim Support NI.

UN declaration 
In 1985, the United Nations adopted the Declaration of Basic Principles of Justice for Victims of Crime and Abuse of Power, which outlines international best practices for treatment of crime victims.  The report recognizes an offender's obligation to make fair restitution to his or her victim, acknowledges that victims are entitled to fair treatment and access to the mechanisms of justice, and generally draws attention to the need for victims' rights in the criminal justice process.  Other United Nations provisions that touch on victims' rights include (1) The International Covenant on Civil and Political Rights (ICCPR); (2) the Convention on the Elimination of Discrimination of Women (CEDAW); and (3) the Convention on the Rights of the Child (CRC).  The ICCPR has been ratified by 172 nations, including the United States, Canada, Russia, and France.  It includes the following provisions related to victims' rights:

 Rights to be protected from harm, which impose obligations on governments to have effective criminal justice systems (Article 6.1, Article 7, and Article 17)
 Rights to be recognized by and treated equally before the law (Articles 2, 3, 16, and 26)
 A right of non-discrimination (Article 2)
 Rights to a remedy and to access to justice (Articles 2 and 14)
 Due process rights (Articles 9, 10, 14, and 15)

In 2008, Human Rights Watch published an analysis comparing United States victims' rights laws to international Human Rights Standards.  This report, titled "Mixed Results: U.S. Policy and International Standards on the Rights and Interests of Crime," found that "while U.S. Jurisdictions, both federal and state, have made significant progress in recent decades, much more can be done to ensure that victims' rights and legitimate interests are upheld." The report states that the U.S. should use the UN's Basic Principles as a guide to inform their laws and policies.  In addition, it recommends that the U.S. adopt policies that: (1) Remove arbitrary limits on the definition of "victim" in state and federal laws; (2) Expand access to victim services and compensation; and (3) "Maintain and enforce standards for the collection and preservation of evidence, particularly rape kit evidence." The report also recommends U.S. ratification of the CEDAW and CRC.

Criticisms of the victim-inclusion approach

There are three major criticisms of the Victims' Rights Movement, and the accompanying victim-inclusion approach to criminal justice.
Some claim that proposed incorporation of victims' rights will directly undermine defendant's rights, since designating the accuser as a "victim" presupposes that the alleged crime actually occurred even before this has been established to be the case in a court of law.
Some view victims' rights as impinging on prosecutorial discretion.
Some argue that victim participation will inappropriately focus criminal proceedings on vengeance and personal emotion.
In connection with the last of these criticisms, it has been noted that victims seeking "closure" may promote outcomes as diverse as retribution, on one hand, and forgiveness on the other, and the legal system is inadequate to providing therapeutic satisfaction in either case.

Proponents of victims' rights respond by noting that victims' rights of privacy, protection and participation are civil rights that ensure that individual harm is among the harms recognized by the system, and that such rights afford a voice in the process, not a veto of enforcement discretion.  Proponents also cite the criminal courts' well-established capacity to afford rights to participants other than the defendants (such as the media), suggesting that accommodation of victims' interests is both possible and desirable.

References

External links 
 Primer: Crime Victims’ Rights U.S. Sentencing Commission
 VictimLaw, Office for Victims of Crime Training and Technical Assistance Center
 Victim’s Law, A bill produced by Keir Starmer, the victims of a crime would have extended right to challenge decisions over criminal investigations.